Helena ("Helen") Johanna Lejeune-Van der Ben (born 25 July 1964 in Amsterdam, North Holland) is a former Dutch field hockey defender, who won the bronze medal with the National Women's Team at the 1988 Summer Olympics.

From 1984 to 1992 she played a total number of 121 international matches for Holland, in which she scored 57 goals, most of them from penalty corners. She retired after the 1992 Summer Olympics in Barcelona, Spain, where the Dutch side finished in sixth place. Later on she became a field hockey coach, at her former club HGC in Wassenaar.

External links
 
 Dutch Hockey Federation

1964 births
Living people
Dutch female field hockey players
Dutch field hockey coaches
Field hockey players at the 1988 Summer Olympics
Field hockey players at the 1992 Summer Olympics
Olympic field hockey players of the Netherlands
Olympic medalists in field hockey
Field hockey players from Amsterdam
Medalists at the 1988 Summer Olympics
Olympic bronze medalists for the Netherlands
Amsterdamsche Hockey & Bandy Club players
HGC players
20th-century Dutch women
20th-century Dutch people
21st-century Dutch women